The first season of the American reality competition streaming series The Circle began on January 1, 2020, on Netflix, and concluded on January 15, 2020. This season was hosted by Michelle Buteau.

Ahead of the season, it was announced that players would be competing against each other to become the most popular, but would never actually meet. Instead they would communicate through a specially designed app and be able to portray themselves in any way they choose. Netflix renewed The Circle for a second and third season on March 24, 2020.

On January 15, 2020, the season was won by Joey Sasso, who had played the game as himself, and won the  prize that came along with it. Shubham Goel was the runner-up.

Format 
The contestants, or "players", move into the same apartment building. However, the contestants do not meet face-to-face during the course of the competition, as they each live in their own individual apartment. They communicate solely using their profiles on a specially-designed social media app that gives them the ability to portray themselves in any way they choose. Players can thus opt to present themselves as a completely different personality to the other players, a tactic otherwise known as catfishing.

Throughout the series, the contestants "rate" one another from first to last place. At the end of the ratings, their average ratings are revealed to one another from lowest to highest. Normally, the two highest-rated players become "Influencers", while the remaining players will be at risk of being "blocked" by the Influencers. However, occasionally there may be a twist to the blocking process – varying from the lowest rating players being instantly blocked, the identity of the Influencers being a secret, or multiple players being blocked at one time. Blocked players are eliminated from the game, but are given the opportunity to meet one player still in the game in-person. Then, the day after a blocking, a video message is shown to the remaining players to reveal if they were real or fake.

Also, fans of The Circle are able to vote for their favorite player. The player that receives the most votes is known as the Fan Favorite and receives .

Players

The first eight players were announced on The Circles Instagram on December 16, 2019. A total of 13 players were selected from the "20–25 individuals" being cleared to appear on the show, with the remaining people never leaving standby status and not appearing on the show. The five players not announced prior to the show's premiere were revealed as they introduced themselves on-screen during an episode.

(Ages stated are at start of contest)

Other appearances 
Joey Sasso has starred in Faraway Bae and Match Me If You Can; he also appeared on four episodes of General Hospital, Dick Dickster, and Girls5eva and will also star in Young Lion of the West, along with writer and producer credits on the project. Joey and Sammie Cimarelli starred on Netflix’s Reality Games and were 2 of the 4 players representing team "The Circle". Shubham Goel has starred in the shorts Baby Cycle, Los Pollitos, and The Bench; he is also set to star in the movie Go Karts R Funner Than Girls, and he later returned to compete in the fifth season of The Circle. Ed Eason starred on season 37 of The Challenge. Tammy Eason appeared on two episodes of The Way to Go. Bill Canley starred on Chicago P.D. in the episode, 43rd and Normal. He will also star in the show Complete Bull which will be released in 2022. Karyn Blanco will star in Face Behind the Dream/I which will be released in September 2022.

Episodes 
On December 29, 2019, The New York Times published an article describing the background and inside of the show. It was revealed that twelve episodes would be airing from January 1 to January 15 with four episodes being released every Wednesday as part of the "three week event."

Production

Development 
The British version of the show premiered in 2018, and was renewed for its second season a few months after the first season ended. After the first season was Channel 4's "youngest profiling" show in six years, according to the British TV industry magazine Broadcast, talks began of international versions. On October 8, 2018, Netflix announced its partnership with All3Media to create three international versions of The Circle on Netflix, including the American version. Brandon Reigg, Netflix's Vice Principal of Unscripted Content, stated, "We think the show's combination of modern social media interaction and competition will captivate Netflix members around the world, in multiple languages, and we're delighted to partner with Studio Lambert and Motion to produce these three new local versions."

Casting 
On April 11, 2019, casting opened for the first season through an online website.

In an interview with Variety, Tim Harcourt, one of the executive producers for Studio Lambert, stated that The Circle format and premise allowed the casting team to search for all different kinds of people. He noted how the casting contrasted from casts on show like Real Housewives or Jersey Shore and how those shows are "all one gang of quite similar characters." He explained how there was no set cast for the show until it was over. The first eight players to enter were all predetermined and planned, but everything after that was all luck to whoever got on. Harcourt stated that the production team would decide who would be the right fit depending on who just left the game, acknowledging that with thirteen contestants, not all who were possible players end up on the show at all.

Filming 
In October 2019, it was reported that filming was completed. All filming was done in August 2019 before the British version's second season in September 2019, and was completed in fifteen days. It was also reported that the American version was filmed in Salford, England, using the same apartment building that was used in the second season of the British version. Attempts to obscure the filming location to appear to be in the United States were apparent, including overhead shots of the cities of Chicago and Milwaukee throughout the show, as well as aerial shots of the United Kingdom reversed so the cars appear to be driving on the right side of the road.

According to participant Joey Sasso, filming of the show took about a month. The contestants' apartments were brightly-lit in part to allow the cameras to record them, but also to disorientate the players' perception of time; Sasso stated that they often had no idea what day or time of day it was, and he had taken to wearing sunglasses inside to cut off the glare from the lights which had been mistaken as a fashion statement by fans of the show. The contestants were given a few minutes each day to spend on the apartment complex's rooftop space.

Release 
On December 10, 2019, a trailer for the American version was released, revealing the premiere date to be January 1, 2020, and the prize amount to be $100,000. On December 29, it was revealed by The New York Times that twelve episodes would be airing from January 1 to January 15 with four episodes being released every Wednesday as part of the "three week event." On December 30, 2019, in order to get more people interested in The Circle, Netflix released a thirty-minute cut of the hour-long first episode of the season on its YouTube channel for free. Then, starting on January 1 and lasting until January 15, Netflix dropped four episodes every week on Wednesday.

Fan Favorite vote 
On January 8, 2020, via Twitter and Instagram, The Circle announced that voting had opened for the Fan Favorite award. The player who had received the most votes would win . Voting opened at midnight on January 8, 2020, PST, and lasted until midnight on January 17. The winner of the Fan Favorite vote was revealed to be Sammie Cimarelli on The Circles Instagram on January 17.

Results and elimination

Notes

Reception 
The Circle received positive reviews from critics. On the review aggregator website Rotten Tomatoes, the season holds an 80% approval rating with an average rating of 6 out of 10 based on 15 reviews. The Circle also became the topic of discussion on the sixth episode of I Like to Watch, where drag queens Trixie Mattel and Katya Zamolodchikova reacted to the first episode. Because of the positive reviews and large number of viewers, Netflix renewed The Circle for a second and third season on March 24, 2020.

Once the show began airing, it was well received. Megh Wright from Vulture proclaimed that The Circle is a "fascinating series" that gives a "brutally honest reflection of the fractured way we attempt to connect to each other today." Kate Knibbs from Wired declared it the "best TV show about the internet" that "actually takes its audience places, dramatizing the experience of online social interactions in all their fizz and slipperiness." The show was also praised for its diverse cast and personalities. According to Etan Smallman of The New York Times, this type of diversity is what makes The Circle so unique among other reality TV shows.

Meanwhile, Isaac Feldberg from Fortune told readers to skip The Circle because of "the aggressively irritating manner in which the series has been put together." Jerrica Tisdale from Screen Rant called the series a "must-see." She comments on how common it is to "develop entire relationships through solely digital interactions," and that is what The Circle is trying to explore.

Nev Schulman, host and executive producer of Catfish: The TV Show criticized The Circle in an interview with People. He said that when you remove the realistic circumstances and realistic people with normal personalities, it is less entertaining than realism. He also expressed disappointment at the use of the word "catfish"; he cites the definition to be "a complicated person who, for any number of reasons and personal struggles, has found themselves creating a profile of varying veracity or truths to explore, and interact, and discover themselves", whereas on The Circle, players use it to simply call someone a liar. Despite these statements, he admits he still watches and enjoys the show.

Aja Romano of Vox praised The Circle for embracing inauthenticity as a part of social media and human nature as a whole. She likens The Circle to a microcosm of social media, saying "Instead of treating 'being fake on the internet' as a shocking betrayal, The Circle embraces it as something we all do in big and small ways, often in the service of making friends and fitting in." She also praises the cast. She mentions how the cast shares very personal things frequently, even through the anonymity of The Circle. Romano states that the cast developed character arcs, and the production team could get away with making a narrative structure.

References 

2020 American television seasons
The Circle (franchise)